the 2021 CAFA U-15 Championship was the 3rd edition of the CAFA U-15 Championship, the international youth football championship organized by CAFA for the men's under-15 national teams of Central Asia. Tajikistan was hosting the tournament. Four nations including the host Tajikistan competed for the title in the eight-day round-robin event, with all teams to cross paths once before the final Matchday on November 23, with players born on or after 1 January 2006 eligible to participate.

Iran having won their first title in 2018. They managed to retain the title after they finished top of the standings edging host Tajikistan on superior goal difference.

Participating nations
A total of 4 (out of 6) CAFA member national teams entered the tournament.

Did not enter

Venues
Matches were held at the Republic Central Stadium.

Match officials
Referees

  Amir Arabbaraghi
  Sanzhar Zhakypbekov
  Amirjon Korkashev
  Abdullo Davlatov
  Abdurashid Khudayberganov

Assistant referees

  Farhad Farhadpour
  Argen Chyngyz Uulu
  Sorban Ahmadzoda
  Bakhtiyorkhuja Shavkatov
  Hasan Nabiyev

Main tournament 
The main tournament schedule was announced on 6 May 2022.

Player awards
The following awards were given at the conclusion of the tournament:

Goalscorers

References

External links

2021 in Asian football
Sport in Dushanbe

2021 CAFA Under-15 Championship
2021 in Tajikistani football
2021 in youth association football